Miklós Rosta (born 14 February 1999) is a Hungarian handballer for SC Pick Szeged and the Hungarian national team.

Achievements
Domestic Competition
Nemzeti Bajnokság:
Winner: 2021, 2022

Awards and recognition
 Hungarian Handballer of the Year: 2022

References

External links

Pick Szeged

Hungarian male handball players
Living people
1999 births
Sportspeople from Győr
SC Pick Szeged players